The Girl of the Golden West is a theatrical play written, produced and directed by David Belasco, set in the California Gold Rush. The four-act melodrama opened at the old Belasco Theatre in New York on November 14, 1905 and ran for 224 performances. Blanche Bates originated the role of The Girl, Robert C. Hilliard played Dick Johnson, and Frank Keenan played Jack Rance. Bates was joined by Charles Millward and Cuyler Hastings for two-week Broadway runs in 1907 and 1908. William Furst composed the play's incidental music. The play toured throughout the US for several years.

The play has been adapted numerous times, most notably as the 1910 opera La fanciulla del West by Giacomo Puccini. It was also made into four films, all titled The Girl of the Golden West, in 1915, 1923, 1930 and 1938. In 1911, Belasco wrote a novel based on the play.

Characters

 The Girl (Minnie)
 Jack Rance, gambler and Sheriff
 Dick Johnson, a stranger
 Sonora Slim
 Trinidad Joe
 Nick, bartender at The Polka
 The Sidney Duck, a faro-dealer
 Jim Larkens
 Handsome Charlie
 Happy Halliday
 Deputy Sheriff
 Ashby, a Wells-Fargo agent
 José Castro, member of Ramerrez's band
 Rider of the Pony Express
 Jack Wallace, a traveling camp minstrel
 Bucking Billy, from Watson's
 The Lookout
 A Faro-dealer
 The Boy from the Ridge
 Joe, Concertina Player
 Citizens of the Camp and Boys of the Ridge
 Wowkle, the fox, Billy Jackrabbit's squaw

Footnotes

Bibliography
Mantle, Burns and Garrison P. Sherwood, eds., The Best Plays of 1899-1909, Philadelphia: The Blakiston Company, 1944.
The Girl of the Golden West theatrical program folder held by the Billy Rose Theatre Division, New York Public Library for the Performing Arts.
"The Girl of the Golden West", Internet Broadway Database, ibdb.com.
American Film Institute, Catalog of Motion Pictures Produced in the United States: Feature Films, 1911-1920, Berkeley, University of California Press, 1988.
American Film Institute, Catalog of Motion Pictures Produced in the United States: Feature Films, 1921-1930, Berkeley, University of California Press, 1971.
American Film Institute, Catalog of Motion Pictures Produced in the United States: Feature Films, 1931-1940, Berkeley, University of California Press, 1993.

External links

 (1911 novel based on the play)

Plays by David Belasco
1905 plays
American plays adapted into films
Plays set in California
California Gold Rush in fiction
Plays adapted into operas